Lawrence Borthwick Kelly may refer to:

Laurie Kelly Sr. (1883–1955), Australian politician
Laurie Kelly (politician) (1928–2018), his son, Australian politician